The Symphony No. 15 in G major, K. 124 by Wolfgang Amadeus Mozart was written in Salzburg during the first weeks of 1772. A note on the autograph manuscript indicates that it might have been written for a religious occasion, possibly in honour of the new Archbishop of Salzburg. The work is in four movements, the first of which has been described as innovative and "daring", in view of its variations of tempo. The last movement is characterised by good humour and frivolity, with "enough ending jokes to bring the house down".

Movements and instrumentation
The work is scored for two oboes, two horns in G, and strings.

Allegro, 
Andante, C major, 
Menuetto and Trio, trio in D major,  
Presto,

Performance details
There are no details available as to when the initial performance took place.

References

Sources
Dearling, Robert: The Music of Wolfgang Amadeus Mozart: The Symphonies Associated University Presses Ltd, London 1982 
Kenyon, Nicholas: The Pegasus Pocket Guide to Mozart Pegasus Books, New York 2006 
Zaslaw, Neal:Mozart's Symphonies: Context, Performance Practice, Reception OUP, Oxford 1991

External links

15
1772 compositions
Compositions in G major